C. iberica  may refer to:
 Centaurea iberica, the Iberian starthistle or Iberian knapweed, a plant species native to southeastern Europe
 Corixa iberica, a water boatman species
 Coronilla iberica, an ornamental plant species

See also
 Iberica (disambiguation)